Edward Owen Giblin (23 November 1849 – 27 December 1895) was an Australian politician.

Giblin was born in Claremont in Tasmania in 1849. He was a doctor before entering politics. In 1891 he was elected to the Tasmanian House of Assembly, representing the seat of South Hobart. He served until his defeat in 1893. He died in 1895 in Launceston.

References

1849 births
1895 deaths
Members of the Tasmanian House of Assembly